A Gaelcholáiste is a secondary school on the island of Ireland (in either the Republic of Ireland or Northern Ireland) located outside Gaeltacht areas, where Irish is the primary language of teaching and communication.

Gaelcholáistí are supported and represented on a practical day-to-day basis by Gaeloideachas (who also support Irish-medium schools in the Gaeltacht) and An Chomhairle um Oideachas Gaeltachta & Gaelscolaíochta (whose name translates into English as "The Council for Gaeltacht and Gaelscoileanna Education") or COGG in the Republic and by Comhairle na Gaelscolaíochta in the North.

There are 31 Gaelcholáistí and 17 second-level Irish language units (aonaid Ghaeilge) on the island of Ireland, attended by over 12,000 students. Close to 4,000 further students receive their second level education through Irish in the Gaeltacht.

History

Gaelcholáistí in the 2010s
The Republic's Department of Education announced in 2012 that three new Gaelcholáistí were going to open- two in Dublin Coláiste Ghlór na Mara in Balbriggan and Gaelcoláiste an Phiarsaigh in Rathfarnham and one in Cork Gaelcholáiste Charraig Uí Leighin in Carrigaline.

Gaelcholáiste Dhoire opened in Dungiven Castle in 2015. Gaelcholáiste Mhic Shuibhne opened in Knocknaheeney, County Cork, in 2019. Gaelcholáiste Mhaigh Nuad opened in Maynooth in 2020.

Many of the Aonaid Ghaeilge hope to develop into full Gaelcholáistí in the medium-term providing there is enough demand.

List of Gaelcholáistí
 Coláiste Ailigh (Letterkenny, Donegal)
 Coláiste an Phiarsaigh (Cork)
 Gaelcholáiste Mhuire (A.G.) (Cork)
 Gaelcoláiste an Phiarsaigh (Rathfarnham, Dublin)
 Gaelcholáiste Charraig Uí Leighin (Cork)
 Scoil Chaitríona (Glasnevin, Dublin Northside)
 Gaelcholáiste Cheatharlach (Carlow)
 Gaelcholáiste Chéitinn (part of CTI Clonmel, Tipperary)
 Gaelcholáiste Chiarraí (Tralee, Kerry)
 Gaelcholáiste Mhaigh Nuad (Maynooth, Kildare).
 Coláiste Chilliain (Clondalkin, Dublin)
 Gaelcholáiste Chill Dara (Naas, Kildare)
 Coláiste Cois Life (Lucan, Dublin)
 Coláiste de hÍde (Tallaght, Dublin)
 Gaelcholáiste Dhoire (Dungiven, Derry)
 Coláiste Eoin (Booterstown, Dublin)
 Coláiste Feirste (Belfast, Antrim)
 Coláiste Ghlór na Mara (Balbriggan, Dublin)
 Coláiste Íosagáin (Booterstown, Dublin)
 Gaelcholáiste Luimnigh (Limerick)
 Gaelcholáiste Mhic Shuibhne (Knocknaheeny, Cork)
 Coláiste Mhuire (Ratoath, Dublin)
 Coláiste na Coiribe (Galway)
 Gaelcholáiste na Mara (Arklow, Wicklow)
 Coláiste Ráithín (Bray, Wicklow)
 Gaelcholáiste Reachrann (Donaghmede, Dublin Northside)
Coláiste an Eachréidh (Athenry, Galway)
Meanscoil Gharman (Enniscorthy, Wexford)

Planned

 Clonsilla (Dublin 15)

See also
Gaelscoil
Gaeloideachas
An Chomhairle um Oideachas Gaeltachta & Gaelscolaíochta
An Foras Pátrúnachta
Comhairle na Gaelscolaíochta

References

External links
 Mapped by County (Note: includes schools in Gaeltacht areas)

 
Irish-language education
Irish words and phrases
Minority schools
Secondary education in Ireland
Secondary education in Northern Ireland